Claudia Waldi ( Engels, born 29 July 1964) is a German rower. Before her wedding between the 1989 and 1990 rowing seasons, she competed under her maiden name.

References 
 
 

1964 births
Living people
German female rowers
World Rowing Championships medalists for West Germany
World Rowing Championships medalists for Germany
21st-century German women
20th-century German women